OO gauge or OO scale (also, 00 gauge and 00 scale) is the most popular standard-gauge model railway standard in the United Kingdom, outside of which it is virtually unknown. OO gauge is one of several 4 mm-scale standards (4 mm to 1 foot, or 1:76.2), and the only one to be marketed by major manufacturers. However, since the 1960s, other gauges in the same scale have arisen—18.2 mm (EM) and 18.83 mm (Scalefour)—to reflect the desire of some modellers for greater scale accuracy.

Origin
Double-0 scale model railways were launched by Bing in 1921 as "The Table Railway", running on  track and scaled at 4 mm-to-the-foot. In 1922, the first models of British prototypes appeared. Initially all locomotives were powered by clockwork, but the first electric power appeared in autumn 1923.

OO describes models with a scale of 4 mm = 1 foot (1:76) running on HO scale 1:87 (3.5 mm = 1 foot) track (16.5 mm/0.650"). This combination came about as early clockwork mechanisms and electric motors were difficult to fit within HO scale models of British trains which are smaller than European and North American counterparts. A quick and cheap solution was to enlarge the scale of the model to 4 mm-to-the-foot but keep the 3.5 mm-to-the-foot gauge track. This also allowed more space to model the external valve gear. The resulting HO track gauge of 16.5 mm represents 4 feet 1.5 inches at 4 mm-to-the-foot scale; this is 7 inches under scale, or approximately 2.33 mm too narrow.

In 1932 the Bing company collapsed, but the Table Railway continued to be manufactured by the new Trix company. Trix decided to use the new HO standard, being approximately half of European 0 gauge (1:43 scale).

In 1938, the Meccano Company launched a new range of OO models under the trade name of Hornby Dublo; OO gauge has remained the UK's most popular scale/gauge ever since.

In the United States, Lionel Corporation introduced a range of OO models in 1938. Soon other companies followed but it did not prove popular and remained on the market only until 1942. OO gauge was quickly eclipsed by HO scale. The Lionel range of OO used 19 mm/¾" track gauge, a scale 57", a track width that was more to scale. There is a small following of American OO scale/gauge today.

OO today
OO remains the most popular scale for railway modelling in Great Britain due to a ready availability of ready-to-run stock and starter sets. Ready-to-run in the UK is dominated by Hornby Railways and Bachmann Branchline. Other sources of ready-to-run rolling stock or locomotives include Dapol, Heljan, Peco, ViTrains and previously Lima. Other scales, with the possible exception of N gauge, lack the variety and affordability of UK ready-to-run products. The quality of OO models has improved over time.

Scaling and accuracy 

 gauge at 4 mm:1 foot means that the scale gauge represents ,  narrower than the prototype . This difference is particularly noticeable when looking along the track. As the market for proprietary track is mostly for HO scale, sleeper size and spacing are designed for HO and are therefore underscale.

OO is also used to represent the  Irish gauge, where it is a scale  too narrow.

Though they run on the same track, OO gauge and HO gauge models of the same prototype do not sit well together since the OO models are larger than the HO equivalent.

These differences have led to the development of the finescale standards of EM gauge and P4 standards. Nevertheless, it is possible to model using OO to standards that fall just short of finescale.

In common with most practical model railways of any scale (and not related to the OO gauge inaccuracy) the following compromises are made: Curves are often sharper than the prototype, and often not transitioned, particularly when using "set-track" systems (radius 1 = 371 mm, 2 = 438 mm, 3 = 505 mm, 4 = 571.5 mm). Overhang from long vehicles means that the normal separation between track centres are overscale to prevent collisions on curves between stock on adjacent lines, at up to 65 mm (for set-track (reduced down to 50 mm for Peco Streamline)). Overscale wheel width and deep wheel flanges are used on typical models (but particularly older models), and these require overscale rail profile and much larger clearances on pointwork than is prototypical. Pointwork is often compressed in length to save space.

4 mm finescale standards 
Many experienced modellers find the OO standard produces a "narrow gauge" appearance when the model is viewed head on. Greater accuracy is possible using either EM gauge or the closer-to-exact scale P4 track.

Whilst flextrack is available for both EM and P4 gauges (from manufacturers such as C&L Finescale, SMP and The P4 Track Company), ready-to-run (RTR) point and crossing (P&C) work is not available, so this trackwork must be constructed by the modeller. Kits for doing this are also available from the aforementioned sources amongst others. Several of these kits are also available to the OO modeller who aims for more realistic track since most RTR track is actually scaled to HO and does not represent any British prototype, and the sleeper spacing is too close for scale. EM gauge has slightly overscale flanges and flangeways on point and crossing work; P4 is closer to scale but the smaller flanges and flangeways on P&C work expose poor track construction.

See also

Other model railway scales

 Rail transport modelling scales

Related scales
OO9 – Used for modelling  narrow gauge railways in 4 mm scale
OOn3 – Used for modelling  narrow gauge railways in 4 mm scale
HO – 3.5 mm scale using the same  gauge track as 00.
EM – 4 mm scale using  track.
P4 – A set of standards using  gauge track (accurate scale standard gauge track).
00-SF – Uses  track with ordinary 00 wheelsets. Allows the tighter trackwork tolerances of EM without the need to re-gauge wheels.

Manufacturers
Kitmaster – Manufactured plastic model kits of railway engines, rolling stock, and buildings.
Airfix – Bought the Kitmaster range and sold it under the Airfix brand until the original Airfix company collapsed in 1981. Some of the tooling was then destroyed, but Dapol (q.v.) bought the remainder. Most Airfix military vehicles are also to 1:76 scale.
Bachmann Branchline – One of the largest manufacturers of ready-to-run 00.
Dapol – Produce kits (using the Kitmaster toolings bought from Airfix) and ready-to-run engines and rolling stock.
Heljan – Produce a small number of locomotives and wagons.
Hornby Railways – One of the largest manufacturers of ready-to-run 00.
Lima – Produced budget 00 ready-to-run, bought by Hornby.
Peco – Produce a wide range of track, kits, and other accessories.

References

External links

Double O gauge Association
History of 00 gauge

4 mm scale
Model railroad scales
Scale model scales